Muellerina flexialabastra, common name Hoop pine mistletoe, is a hemiparasitic aerial shrub in the family Loranthaceae. The species is 
endemic to Queensland.

Description
M. flexialabastra is a compact, bushy plant  found in high altitude sub-tropical rainforests and the drier rainforests between Queensland and New South Wales. The inflorescence is a terminal raceme off a central axis, and the pink to red tubular flowers occur in strongly reflexed, decussate pairs with a central sessile flower. The ovoid fruits (6 – 15 mm long) are a red-blotched yellowish-green.

Ecology 
The main host on which M. flexialabastra grows is  Hoop pine (Araucaria cunninghamii). An inventory of host plants for Muellerina flexialabastra  is given by Downey.

Muellerina flexialabastra is not known to host any butterflies, but butterfly species using M. celastroides may use this mistletoe as well.

Taxonomy
The species was first described by Paul Downey and Carol Wilson in 2004 as Muellerina flexialabastra. There are no synonyms.

References

External links 
  AVH: Occurrence data for Muellerina flexialabastra

Parasitic plants
Flora of Queensland
flexialabastra
Taxa named by Paul O. Downey
Plants described in 2004